Kolzam RegioVan - a series of railcars produced in Poland, produced by Kolzam in Racibórz in 2003-2005 and by Fablok in Chrzanów in between 2011-2012. Kolzam jointly produced: two single units  (SA107 - 211M type) and 10 double units (SA109 - 212M type), the eleventh railcar was produced by Fablok. There had not been any triple units produced.

History

Origin

Since the 1990s the PKP Group owned 6 railcars produced by Kolzam and 6 by ZNTK Poznań.

The PKP in the 1990s planned to receive the 16 ordered Pendolinos, 50 EU11/EU43 from Bombardier Transportation Polska and a few hundred railcars for local connections. The order for the Pendolinos was cancelled in 2000 after the control by the Supreme Audit Office. All the orders were cancelled due to the financial situation PKP was in and in 2002 all of the delivered locomotives were sold to the Italian passenger transportation company Ferrovie dello Stato Italiane.

The order for the railcars never happened. But both Kolzam and  ZNTK Poznań had drawn up plans and began a full structural project to create the railcar, and built the Kolzam 208M which has never been used.

By the end of 2000 after the restructure of the financing of the PKP for regional transportation, which created the Przewozy Regionalne which allowed the company to use finances for rolling stock. Which meant the company chose to order one, two and three unit railcars.

Together with Kolzam ZNTK Poznań built the ZNTK Poznań Regio Tramp and Pesa with the Pesa 214M.

Bankruptcy of Kolzam

After the declaration of bankruptcy by the manufacturer in August 2005, the documentation and the right to produce of the RegioVan was bought by Fablok. Kolzam itself was bought by the Hungarian company MAVEX-Record in 2007.

Construction

The RegioVan is a one level, partly low-floor railcar for regional passenger service on less busy, mostly non-electrified railway lines. Produced in single and double units. The triple unit although being a project did not become realised.

In contrast to the previous designs of the Kolzam SN81 and SA104, the RegioVans have a modular lightweight body structure with a low floor in the entrance area. The height of the floor in the lower level is 575–600 mm and in the partly high level with steps and a ramp the height is 1090 mm.

The units have double slide doors on both sides with a width of 1300 mm, located in the low floor area. Under each door there is a sliding step for easy boarding and access to the vehicle.

Both the 211M unit, the 212M one-axle unit (18MNb) and the (31ANb) are a one-axle unit. The planned three-axle unit, was to have had a third unit. The drive unit had an integrated engine with a power transmission and reverse shuttle which was placed under the floor in the power-pack engine system.

The units are equipped with standard safety automation equipment: automatic train braking and Radio-Stop.

Versions

References

Articulated passenger trains